Chumerna Glacier is the 2.2 km long and 1.9 km wide glacier draining the north slopes of Stavertsi Ridge on Albena Peninsula, Brabant Island in the Palmer Archipelago, Antarctica.  It flows northeastwards to enter the channel between Brabant Island and Liège Island east of Hales Peak.

The glacier is named after Chumerna Peak in eastern Balkan Mountains, Bulgaria.

Location
British mapping in 1980.

See also
 List of glaciers in the Antarctic
 Glaciology

Maps
 Antarctic Digital Database (ADD). Scale 1:250000 topographic map of Antarctica. Scientific Committee on Antarctic Research (SCAR). Since 1993, regularly upgraded and updated.
British Antarctic Territory. Scale 1:200000 topographic map. DOS 610 Series, Sheet W 64 62. Directorate of Overseas Surveys, Tolworth, UK, 1980.
Brabant Island to Argentine Islands. Scale 1:250000 topographic map. British Antarctic Survey, 2008.

References
 Bulgarian Antarctic Gazetteer. Antarctic Place-names Commission. (details in Bulgarian, basic data in English)
 Chumerna Glacier. SCAR Composite Antarctic Gazetteer

External links
 Chumerna Glacier. Copernix satellite image

Glaciers of the Palmer Archipelago
Bulgaria and the Antarctic
Brabant Island